Leonard Peterson was an American sound engineer. He was nominated for an Academy Award in the category Best Sound for the film The Hindenburg.

Selected filmography
 The Hindenburg (1975; co-nominated with John A. Bolger Jr., John L. Mack and Don Sharpless)

References

External links

Year of birth missing
Possibly living people
American audio engineers
20th-century American engineers